Plasma is a desktop environment by KDE, and can refer to:

 KDE Plasma 5 (2014–today)
 KDE Plasma 4 (2008–2015)
 Plasma Mobile for smartphones
 Plasma Bigscreen for TVs and set-top boxes